Kahzin Daniels (born October 26, 1995) is an American football outside linebacker for the Memphis Showboats of the United States Football League (USFL). He played college football at the University of Charleston.

College career
Daniels played four seasons for the Charleston Golden Eagles. He was named second-team All-Mountain East Conference (MEC) after recording 49 tackles and 12 sacks in his junior season. Daniels recorded 55 tackles, 18.5 tackles for loss and 9.5 sacks and was named first-team All-MEC as a senior. He finished his collegiate career with 161 total tackles and a school record 34.5 sacks.

Professional career

Tampa Bay Buccaneers
Daniels signed with the Tampa Bay Buccaneers as an undrafted free agent on April 27, 2019. He was waived by the team with an injury designation on August 24, 2019, during training camp. Daniels was re-signed by the Buccaneers to their practice squad on October 17, 2019. The Bucs promoted him to the active roster on November 6. Daniels made his NFL debut on November 10, 2019, against the Arizona Cardinals. Daniels played in two games as rookie.

On September 5, 2020, Daniels was waived by the Buccaneers.

Memphis Showboats
Daniels signed with the Tampa Bay Bandits of the United States Football League on October 6, 2022.

Daniels and all other Tampa Bay Bandits players were all transferred to the Memphis Showboats after it was announced that the Bandits were taking a hiatus and that the Showboats were joining the league.

Personal
Daniels is legally blind in his right eye.

References

External links
Charleston Golden Eagles bio
Tampa Bay Buccaneers bio

1995 births
Living people
American football outside linebackers
Charleston Golden Eagles football players
Players of American football from Newark, New Jersey
Tampa Bay Bandits (2022) players
Tampa Bay Buccaneers players
Sportspeople with a vision impairment